In the mathematical field of graph theory, Kirchhoff's theorem or Kirchhoff's matrix tree theorem named after Gustav Kirchhoff is a theorem about the number of spanning trees in a graph, showing that this number can be computed in polynomial time from the determinant of a submatrix of the Laplacian matrix of the graph; specifically, the number is equal to any cofactor of the Laplacian matrix. Kirchhoff's theorem is a generalization of Cayley's formula which provides the number of spanning trees in a complete graph.

Kirchhoff's theorem relies on the notion of the Laplacian matrix of a graph that is equal to the difference between the graph's degree matrix (a diagonal matrix with vertex degrees on the diagonals) and its adjacency matrix (a (0,1)-matrix with 1's at places corresponding to entries where the vertices are adjacent and 0's otherwise).

For a given connected graph G with n labeled vertices, let λ1, λ2, ..., λn−1 be the non-zero eigenvalues of its Laplacian matrix. Then the number of spanning trees of G is

An example using the matrix-tree theorem 

First, construct the Laplacian matrix Q for the example diamond graph G (see image on the right):

 

Next, construct a matrix Q* by deleting any row and any column from Q.  For example, deleting row 1 and column 1 yields

 

Finally, take the determinant of Q* to obtain t(G), which is 8 for the diamond graph. (Notice t(G) is the (1,1)-cofactor of Q in this example.)

Proof outline 

(The proof below is based on the Cauchy-Binet formula. An elementary induction argument for Kirchhoff's theorem can be found on page 654 of Moore (2011).)

First notice that the Laplacian matrix has the property that the sum of its entries across any row and any column is 0. Thus we can transform any minor into any other minor by adding rows and columns, switching them, and multiplying a row or a column by −1. Thus the cofactors are the same up to sign, and it can be verified that, in fact, they have the same sign.

We proceed to show that the determinant of the minor M11 counts the number of spanning trees. Let n be the number of vertices of the graph, and m the number of its edges. The incidence matrix E is an n-by-m matrix, which may be defined as follows: suppose that (i, j) is the kth edge of the graph, and that i < j. Then Eik = 1, Ejk = −1, and all other entries in column k are 0 (see oriented incidence matrix for understanding this modified incidence matrix E).  For the preceding example (with n = 4 and m = 5):

Recall that the Laplacian L can be factored into the product of the incidence matrix and its transpose, i.e., L = EET. Furthermore, let F be the matrix E with its first row deleted, so that FFT = M11.

Now the Cauchy-Binet formula allows us to write

where S ranges across subsets of [m] of size n − 1, and FS denotes the (n − 1)-by-(n − 1) matrix whose columns are those of F with index in S. Then every S specifies n − 1 edges of the original graph, and it can be shown that those edges induce a spanning tree if and only if the determinant of FS is +1 or −1, and that they do not induce a spanning tree if and only if the determinant is 0. This completes the proof.

Particular cases and generalizations

Cayley's formula 

Cayley's formula follows from Kirchhoff's theorem as a special case, since every vector with 1 in one place, −1 in another place, and 0 elsewhere is an eigenvector of the Laplacian matrix of the complete graph, with the corresponding eigenvalue being n.  These vectors together span a space of dimension n − 1, so there are no other non-zero eigenvalues.

Alternatively, note that as Cayley's formula counts the number of distinct labeled trees of a complete graph Kn we need to compute any cofactor of the Laplacian matrix of Kn. The Laplacian matrix in this case is

Any cofactor of the above matrix is nn−2, which is Cayley's formula.

Kirchhoff's theorem for multigraphs 

Kirchhoff's theorem holds for multigraphs as well; the matrix Q is modified as follows:
 The entry qi,j equals −m, where m is the number of edges between i and j;
 when counting the degree of a vertex, all loops are excluded.

Explicit enumeration of spanning trees 

Kirchhoff's theorem can be strengthened by altering the definition of the Laplacian matrix. Rather than merely counting edges emanating from each vertex or connecting a pair of vertices, label each edge with an indeterminate and let the (i, j)-th entry of the modified Laplacian matrix be the sum over the indeterminates corresponding to edges between the i-th and j-th vertices when i does not equal j, and the negative sum over all indeterminates corresponding to edges emanating from the i-th vertex when i equals j.

The determinant of the modified Laplacian matrix by deleting any row and column (similar to finding the number of spanning trees from the original Laplacian matrix), above is then a homogeneous polynomial (the Kirchhoff polynomial) in the indeterminates corresponding to the edges of the graph. After collecting terms and performing all possible cancellations, each monomial in the resulting expression represents a spanning tree consisting of the edges corresponding to the indeterminates appearing in that monomial. In this way, one can obtain explicit enumeration of all the spanning trees of the graph simply by computing the determinant.

Matroids 
The spanning trees of a graph form the bases of a graphic matroid, so Kirchhoff's theorem provides a formula to count the number of bases in a graphic matroid. The same method may also be used to count the number of bases in regular matroids, a generalization of the graphic matroids .

Kirchhoff's theorem for directed multigraphs 
Kirchhoff's theorem can be modified to count the number of oriented spanning trees in directed multigraphs.
The matrix Q is constructed as follows:
 The entry qi,j for distinct i and j equals −m, where m is the number of edges from i to j;
 The entry qi,i equals the indegree of i minus the number of loops at i.
The number of oriented spanning trees rooted at a vertex i is the determinant of the matrix gotten by removing the ith row and column of Q.

Counting spanning k-component forests 
Kirchhoff's theorem can be generalized to count -component spanning forests in an unweighted graph. A -component spanning forest is a subgraph with  connected components that contains all vertices and is cycle-free, i.e., there is at most one path between each pair of vertices. Given such a forest F with connected components , define its weight  to be the product of the number of vertices in each component. Then

The last factor in the polynomial is due to the zero eigenvalue . More explicitly, the number  can be computed as

For example

Since a spanning forest with n–1 components corresponds to a single edge, the k = n – 1 case states that the sum of the eigenvalues of Q is twice the number of edges. The k = 1 case corresponds to the original Kirchhoff theorem since the weight of every spanning tree is n.

The proof can be done analogously to the proof of Kirchhoff's theorem. An invertible  submatrix of the incidence matrix corresponds bijectively to a k-component spanning forest with a choice of vertex for each component.

The coefficients  are up to sign the coefficients of the characteristic polynomial of Q.

See also 
List of topics related to trees
Markov chain tree theorem
Minimum spanning tree
Prüfer sequence

References 

.
.
.

External links 
A proof of Kirchhoff's theorem

Algebraic graph theory
Spanning tree
Theorems in graph theory
Gustav Kirchhoff